The mission of the American College of Employee Benefits Counsel is to increase the public's understanding of employee benefits law and to raise its standards. It encourages the study, development and sponsors continuing legal education of employee benefits laws.

External links
 

Employee benefits
501(c)(3) organizations
Organizations established in 2000
2000 establishments in New York (state)